Hybodontiformes, commonly called hybodonts, are an extinct group of shark-like chondrichthyans, which existed from the late Devonian to the Late Cretaceous. They form the group of Elasmobranchii closest to neoselachians, the clade of modern sharks and rays. Hybodonts were named and are distinguished based on their conical tooth shape. They are also noted for the presence of a spine on each of their two dorsal fins. They were abundant in marine and freshwater environments during the late Paleozoic and early Mesozoic, but were rare in open marine environments by the end of the Jurassic, having been largely replaced by modern sharks, though they were still common in freshwater and marginal marine habitats. They survived until the end of the Cretaceous, before going extinct.

Etymology
The term hybodont comes from the Greek word ὕβος or ὑβός meaning hump or hump-backed and ὀδούς, ὀδοντ meaning tooth. This name was given based on their conical compressed teeth.

Taxonomic history 
Hybodonts were first described in the nineteenth century based on isolated fossil teeth (Agassiz, 1837). Hybodonts were first separated from living sharks by Zittel (1911). Hybodontiformes are a type of elasmobranch, and the sister group to Neoselachii. Hybodontiformes are classified in the Elasmobranchii with Xenacanthiformes, Ctenacanthiformes and Neoselachii. Hybodonts are divided into a number of families, including Hybodontidae, but the higher level taxonomy of hybodonts, especially Mesozoic taxa, is poorly resolved.

Morphology and teeth 
Due to their cartilaginous skeletons usually disintergrating upon death like other chondrichthyans, hybodonts are generally described and identified based on size and shape of teeth and fin spine fossils, which are more likely to be preserved. Rare complete skeletons are known from areas of exceptional preservation.

Hybodonts are recognized as having teeth with a prominent cusp which is higher than lateral cusplets. Hybodont teeth are often preserved as incomplete fossils because the base of the tooth is not well attached to the crown. Hybodonts were initially divided into two groups based on their tooth shape. One group had teeth with acuminate cusps that lacked a pulp cavity; these are called osteodont teeth. The other group had a different cusp arrangement and had a pulp cavity, these are called orthodont teeth. For example, the hybodont species Heterophychodus steinmanni have osteodont teeth with vascular canals of dentine which are arranged vertically parallel to each other, also called ‘tubular dentine’. The crowns of these osteodont teeth are covered with a single layer of enameloid. Hybodont teeth served a variety of functions depending on the species, including grinding, crushing (durophagy), tearing, clutching, and even cutting.

Hybodonts are characterized by having two dorsal fins each preceded by a fin spine with a specific shape. The fin spines shape is used to distinguish hybodonts from other shark groups and different hybodont species. The fin spines are elongate and gently curved toward the back of the animal. Male hybodonts had either one or two pairs of cephalic spines on their heads. Hybodonts had a fully heterocercal tail fin, where the upper lobe of the fin was much larger than the lower one due to the spine extending into it.

Evolutionary history
The earliest hybodont remains are from the latest Devonian (Famennian) of Iran, belonging to the genus Roongodus. Although the first fossils of hybodonts are from the latest Devonian, they likely branched off from neoselachians (modern sharks) during the early Devonian.

Hybodont samples have been recovered from Permian deposits from Oman, indicating that hybodonts lived in the Neotethys Ocean during the Permian Period.  This study combined with others from Texas suggest that hybodonts were well established, and in some places dominant, during the Permian. In general, the Permian record of hybodonts is limited. It was initially hypothesized that hybodont diversity was not significantly impacted by the end-Permian extinction, instead it was thought that diversity of Permian hybodonts declined over the 50 million years before the end-Permian extinction. However, recent samples found in Oman suggests that Permian hybodont diversity extended until the end-Permian, suggesting the extinction was more impactful than previously thought. Fossils from the Lower Triassic Vega-Phroso Siltstone Member of the Sulphur Mountain Formation of Alberta, Canada show well preserved specimens of Wapitiodus aplopagus which survived the extinction and was abundant in the Early Triassic. Maximum hybodont diversity is observed during the Triassic. During the Triassic and Early Jurassic, hybodontiforms were the dominant selachians in both marine and non-marine environments. A study of Middle Jurassic fossils from England analyzed 20 species from 11 genera suggesting that hybodonts flourished at that time. A shift in hybodonts was seen during the Middle Jurassic, a transition between the distinctly different assemblages seen in the Triassic – Early Jurassic and the Late Jurassic – Cretaceous. As neoselachians (group of modern sharks) diversified further during the Late Jurassic, hybodontiforms became less prevalent in open marine conditions but remained diverse in fluvial and restricted settings during the Cretaceous.
By the Cretaceous, hybodontiforms were primarily (though not solely) restricted to freshwater settings. They remained successful during the Cretaceous by adapting to freshwater conditions, for example seven genera were found in freshwater deposits from Thailand. The end-Cretaceous extinction of hybodont sharks may have been caused more by competition with other sharks than by the meteorite impact and volcanic eruptions cited to be the main cause of this extinction event. Most other sharks were not significantly affected by the end-Cretaceous extinction, also suggesting that competition led to the demise of hybodonts.

Habitat 
Hybodont teeth fossils are found in depositional environments ranging from marine to fluvial (river deposits). When they first evolved they inhabited both marine and freshwater systems. While hybodonts lived in freshwater throughout their existence, an example of hybodonts moving into more restricted conditions comes from Middle Jurassic samples found in lagoonal and other enclosed depositional settings. Based on isotopic analysis, some species of hybodonts are likely to have permanently lived in freshwater environments, while others may have migrated between marine and freshwater environments.

Behavior
Hybodonts were likely slow swimmers and used their paired fins for steering and stabilization. Hybodus, a typical hybodontiform, was thought to be a slow swimmer but capable of occasional bursts on speed, making it an active predator of fast moving prey.
Hybodonts have a wide variety of tooth shapes. This variety suggests that they took advantage of multiple food sources. It is thought that some hybodonts which had wider, flatter, teeth specialized in crushing hard-shelled prey (durophagy), evidence for this includes well-developed wear facets on teeth from Lissodus. Species described from Thailand have a range of teeth shapes, suggesting multiple feeding habits. Bulbous teeth were used for crushing hard shelled bottom-dwelling prey. Others were opportunistic feeders and were species that had a diet of large soft-bodied prey. Little is known about the reproductive habits of hybodonts. One study found abundant fossil teeth and eggs sacks in freshwater lake deposits from the Triassic of Kyrgyzstan. The site was interpreted as an ancient shark nursery based on the abundance of eggs and juvenile fossils and the limited number of adult specimens.

References

External links
 https://web.archive.org/web/20081106004709/http://palaeos.com/Vertebrates/Units/070Chondrichthyes/070.600.html#Hybodontiformes
 http://www.helsinki.fi/~mhaaramo/metazoa/deuterostoma/chordata/chondrichthyes/elasmobranchii/hybodontiformes/hybodontiformes.html

 
Prehistoric cartilaginous fish orders
Carboniferous first appearances
Pennsylvanian taxonomic orders
Cisuralian taxonomic orders
Guadalupian taxonomic orders
Lopingian taxonomic orders
Early Triassic taxonomic orders
Middle Triassic taxonomic orders
Late Triassic taxonomic orders
Early Jurassic taxonomic orders
Middle Jurassic taxonomic orders
Late Jurassic taxonomic orders
Early Cretaceous taxonomic orders
Late Cretaceous taxonomic orders